Poecilia is a genus of fishes in the family Poeciliidae of the order Cyprinodontiformes. These livebearers are native to fresh, brackish and salt water in the Americas, and some species in the genus are euryhaline. A few have adapted to living in waters that contain high levels of toxic hydrogen sulfide and a population of P. mexicana lives in caves (other populations of this species are surface-living).

Some common and widespread species are often kept as aquarium fish, while other have very small ranges and are seriously threatened. All species in Poecilia are called mollies except for the Endler's livebearer (P. wingei) and the well-known guppy (P. reticulata) which have a distinctly different body shape from the rest of the genus.

Micropoecilia has been proposed to be included as a subgenus of Poecilia.

Etymology, taxonomy and history
Franz Steindachner first described the species in 1863. Poecilia refers to the Greek word poikilos, which means "with a lot of colours". Common names include "shortfin molly" and "Atlantic molly." The type specimen was found in Orizaba, Mexico.

Aquaria
Fish of this genus have extremely variable coloration and have been selectively bred to create many different varieties. The most commonly kept species are guppies (P. reticulata), mollies (P. sphenops or P. latipinna), and Endler's livebearers (P. wingei). Members of the genus readily hybridize with each other and so most commercially offered fish are hybrids (with guppies having some Endler, and mollies being a mix of common and sailfin mollies).

They are easy to sex as males have a prominent gonopodium, a modified anal fin used to inseminate females. They mature quickly and breed readily, with females giving birth to a dozen or more fry every month. Poecilids are cannibalistic and will eat any of their fry that are unable to flee in time (with females often eating the fry they just gave birth to, especially in a cramped aquarium setting).

Species
The 40 currently recognized species in this genus are:
 Poecilia boesemani Poeser, 2003
 Poecilia butleri D. S. Jordan, 1889 (Pacific molly)
 Poecilia catemaconis R. R. Miller, 1975 (Catemaco molly)
 Poecilia caucana (Steindachner, 1880) (Cauca molly)
 Poecilia caudofasciata (Regan, 1913)
 Poecilia chica R. R. Miller, 1975 (dwarf molly)
 Poecilia dauli M. K. Meyer & Radda, 2000
 Poecilia dominicensis (Evermann & H. W. Clark, 1906)
 Poecilia elegans (Trewavas, 1948) (elegant molly)
 Poecilia formosa (Girard, 1859) (Amazon molly)
 Poecilia gillii (Kner, 1863)
 Poecilia hispaniolana Rivas, 1978 (Hispaniola molly)
 Poecilia hondurensis Poeser, 2011
 Poecilia kempkesi Poeser, 2013
 Poecilia koperi Poeser, 2003
 Poecilia kykesis Poeser, 2002
 Poecilia latipinna (Lesueur, 1821) (sailfin molly)
 Poecilia latipunctata Meek, 1904 (broadspotted molly)
 Poecilia marcellinoi Poeser, 1995
 Poecilia maylandi M. K. Meyer, 1983 (Balsas molly)
 Poecilia mechthildae M. K. Meyer, Etzel & Bork, 2002
 Poecilia mexicana Steindachner, 1863 (shortfin molly)
 Poecilia nicholsi (G. S. Myers, 1931)
 Poecilia obscura Schories, M. K. Meyer & Schartl, 2009
 Poecilia orri Fowler, 1943 (mangrove molly)
 Poecilia parae C. H. Eigenmann, 1894
 Poecilia petenensis Günther, 1866 (Peten molly)
 Poecilia reticulata W. K. H. Peters, 1859 (guppy)
 Poecilia rositae M. K. Meyer, K. Schneider, Radda, B. Wilde & Schartl, 2004
 Poecilia salvatoris Regan, 1907 (Liberty molly)
 Poecilia sarrafae Bragança & W. J. E. M. Costa, 2011
 Poecilia sphenops Valenciennes, 1846 (black molly)
 Poecilia sulphuraria (Álvarez, 1948) (sulphur molly)
 Poecilia teresae D. W. Greenfield, 1990 (mountain molly)
 Poecilia vandepolli van Lidth de Jeude, 1887
 Poecilia velifera (Regan, 1914) (Yucatán molly)
 Poecilia vivipara Bloch & J. G. Schneider, 1801
 Poecilia waiapi Bragança, W. J. E. M. Costa & Gama, 2012
 Poecilia wandae Poeser, 2003
 Poecilia wingei Poeser, Kempkes & Isbrücker, 2005 (Endler's guppy, Endler's livebearer)

If Poecilia in the wider sense is used then the species would be divided up into subgenera as follows:

 Poecilia Bloch & Schneider 1801 
Poecilia (Poecilia) vivipara
 Acanthophacelus Eigenmann 1907
 Poecilia (Acanthophacelus) kempkesi
 Poecilia (Acanthophacelus) obscura
 Poecilia (Acanthophacelus) reticulata
 Poecilia (Acanthophacelus) wingei
 Allopoecilia Hubbs 1924 
 Poecilia (Allopoecilia) caucana
 Poecilia (Allopoecilia) dauli 
 Curtipenis Rivas & Myers 1950
 Poecilia (Curtipenis) elegans
 Limia Poey 1854
 Poecilia (Limia) caudofasciata
 Poecilia (Limia) caymanensi
 Poecilia (Limia) dominicensis
 Poecilia (Limia) fuscomaculata
 Poecilia (Limia) garnieri
 Poecilia (Limia) grossidens
 Poecilia (Limia) immaculata
 Poecilia (Limia) melanogaster
 Poecilia (Limia) melanonotata
 Poecilia (Limia) miragoanensis
 Poecilia (Limia) nicholsi
 Poecilia (Limia) nigrofasciata
 Poecilia (Limia) ornata
 Poecilia (Limia) pauciradiata
 Poecilia (Limia) perugiae
 Poecilia (Limia) rivasi
 Poecilia (Limia) sulphurophila
 Poecilia (Limia) tridens
 Poecilia (Limia) versicolor
 Poecilia (Limia) vittata
 Poecilia (Limia) yaguajali
 Poecilia (Limia) zonata
 Micropoecilia Hubbs 1926 
 Poecilia (Micropoecilia) bifurca
 Poecilia (Micropoecilia) branneri
 Poecilia (Micropoecilia) minima
 Poecilia (Micropoecilia) parae
 Poecilia (Micropoecilia) picta
 Poecilia (Micropoecilia) sarrafae
 Poecilia (Micropoecilia) waiapi
 Mollienesia Lesueur 1821
 Poecilia (Mollienesia) boesemani
 Poecilia (Mollienesia) butleri
 Poecilia (Mollienesia) catemaconis
 Poecilia (Mollienesia) chica
 Poecilia (Mollienesia) formosa
 Poecilia (Mollienesia) gillii
 Poecilia (Mollienesia) hondurensis
 Poecilia (Mollienesia) koperi
 Poecilia (Mollienesia) kykesis
 Poecilia (Mollienesia) latipinna
 Poecilia (Mollienesia) latipunctata
 Poecilia (Mollienesia) limantouri
 Poecilia (Mollienesia) marcellinoi
 Poecilia (Mollienesia) maylandi
 Poecilia (Mollienesia) mechthildae
 Poecilia (Mollienesia) mexicana
 Poecilia (Mollienesia) nelsoni
 Poecilia (Mollienesia) orri
 Poecilia (Mollienesia) petenensis
 Poecilia (Mollienesia) rositae
 Poecilia (Mollienesia) salvatoris
 Poecilia (Mollienesia) sphenops
 Poecilia (Mollienesia) sulphuraria
 Poecilia (Mollienesia) teresae
 Poecilia (Mollienesia) thermalis
 Poecilia (Mollienesia) vandepolli
 Poecilia (Mollienesia) velifera
 Poecilia (Mollienesia) wandae
 Pseudolimia Poeser 2002 
 Poecilia (Pseudolimia) heterandria
 Psychropoecilia Myers 1935
 Poecilia (Psychropoecilia) hispaniolana
 Poecilia (Psychropoecilia) montana

Gallery

References

External links
Poecilla care information
 www.mollyfish.com

 
Live-bearing fish
Ovoviviparous fish
Freshwater fish genera
Ray-finned fish genera
Taxa named by Marcus Elieser Bloch
Taxa named by Johann Gottlob Theaenus Schneider